Queets Glacier is located in the Olympic Mountains in Olympic National Park in the U.S. state of Washington. The ice reaches as low as  before terminating and giving rise to the headwaters of the Queets River.

See also
List of glaciers in the United States

References

Glaciers of the Olympic Mountains
Glaciers of Jefferson County, Washington
Glaciers of Washington (state)